Seitsemän veljestä (literally translated The Seven Brothers, or The Brothers Seven in Douglas Robinson's 2017 translation) is the first and only novel by Aleksis Kivi, the national author of Finland. It is widely regarded as the first significant novel written in Finnish and by a Finnish-speaking author, and it is considered to be a real pioneer of Finnish realistic folklore. Today, some people still regard it as the greatest Finnish novel ever written, and in time it has even gained the status of a "national novel of Finland". The deep significance of the work for Finnish culture has even been quoted internationally, and in a BBC article by Lizzie Enfield, for example, describes Kivi's Seitsemän veljestä as "the book that shaped a Nordic identity."

Kivi began writing the work in the early 1860s and wrote it at least three times, but no manuscript has survived. The work was largely created while Kivi lived in Siuntio's Fanjurkars with Charlotta Lönnqvist. It was first time published in 1870, but the publication of actual novel did not appear until 1873, a year after the author's death.

Reception history
Published in 1870, Seitsemän veljestä ended an era dominated by Swedish-speaking authors, most notable of whom was J. L. Runeberg, and created a solid basis for new Finnish authors like Minna Canth and Juhani Aho, who were, following Aleksis Kivi, the first authors to depict ordinary Finns in a realistic way. Seitsemän veljestä has been translated three times into English, by Alex. Matson, Richard Impola, and Douglas Robinson; and 56 more times into 33 other languages. Many significant Finnish artists have been responsible for illustrating the book, including Akseli Gallén-Kallela (1908), Marcus Collin (1948), Matti Visanti (1950) and Erkki Tanttu (1961).

 

The novel was particularly reviled by the literary circles of Kivi's time, who disliked the unflattering image of Finns it presented. The title characters were seen as crude caricatures of the nationalistic ideals of the time. Foremost in this hostile backlash was the influential critic August Ahlqvist, who called the book a "ridiculous work and a blot on the name of Finnish literature" and wrote in review published in Finlands Allmänna Tidning that "the brothers' characters were nothing like calm, serious and laborious folk who toiled the Finnish lands." Another critic worth mentioning was the Fennoman politician Agathon Meurman, who, among other things, said the book was "a hellish lie about Finnish peasants" and stated that "Mr. Kivi regards the printing press as his poetic rectum."

Literary scholar Markku Eskelinen considers Seitsemän veljestä to be very exceptional compared to his time of birth and the state of Finnish prose literature at that time. According to Eskelinen, the work is more tense and aesthetically complex than the realistic novels of the significant generation of writers who followed Kivi. Eskelinen also highlights Kivi's linguistic play with genres: although the work uses a lot of biblical and otherwise religious language for understandable reasons due to the dominance of religious literature at the time, its attitude to religious authority is not submissive, unlike other prose literature of the time. In Eskelinen's opinion, Finnish-language prose works comparable to the richness and multilevelness of Kivi's work began to appear only in the next century.

The novel is referred to in the coat of arms of the Nurmijärvi municipality, the birthplace of Kivi. The explanation of the coat of arms is “in the blue field, the heads of seven young golden-haired young men set 2+3+2.” The coat of arms was designed by Olof Eriksson in accordance with the idea proposed by B. Harald Hellström, and was approved by the Nurmijärvi Municipal Council at its meeting on December 18, 1953. The coat of arms was approved for use by the Ministry of the Interior on April 14, 1954.

Characters

Jukola brothers
Juhani – at 25 years old the oldest brother. The leader of the group and also the most stubborn.
Tuomas – scrupulous, strong as a bull, although Juhani claims to be the strongest brother.
Aapo – twin-brother of Tuomas. Logical and peaceful.
Simeoni – alcoholic and the most religious brother.
Lauri – the most solemn brother, friend of nature and a loner.
Timo – twin-brother of Lauri; simple and earnest.
Eero – at 18 years old he is the youngest brother. Intelligent, clever, quarrelsome when confronted by Juhani.

Other
Venla, a neighbor girl wooed by five of the seven brothers

Plot summary
At first, the brothers are not a particularly peaceful lot and end up quarreling with the local constable, juryman, vicar, churchwarden, and teachers—not to mention their neighbours in the village of Toukola. No wonder young girls' mothers do not regard them as good suitors. When the brothers are required to learn to read before they can accept church confirmation and therefore official adulthood—and the right to marry—they decide to run away.

Eventually they end up moving to distant Impivaara in the middle of relative wilderness, but their first efforts are shoddy—one Christmas Eve they end up burning down their sauna. The next spring they try again, but are forced to kill a nearby lord's herd of bulls and pay them back with wheat. Ten years of hard work clearing the forest for fields, hard drinking—and Simeoni's apocalyptic visions from delirium tremens—eventually lead them to mend their ways. They learn to read on their own and eventually return to Jukola.

In the end, most of them become pillars of the community and family men. Still, the tone of the tale is not particularly moralistic. Symbolically, the brothers represent the Finnish-speaking people and culture in the midst of external forces that force them to change.

Adaptations
The novel was adapted into a children's picture book with all the characters being changed into dogs or birds, which was named "The Seven Dog Brothers: Being a Doggerel Version of The Seven Brothers, Aleksis Kivi's Classic Novel from 1870". The book was published in 2002 and is credited to Mauri Kunnas, a Finnish children's author, and Tarja Kunnas.  Mr. Clutterbuck from "Goodnight, Mr. Clutterbuck" also by Mauri Kunnas makes an appearance in the story.

In 1989 a TV series  was directed by Jouko Turkka. The series caused wide controversy because of its portrayal of the brothers.

See also

 About Seven Brothers
 Heath Cobblers
 Kalevala''

References

External links

The Aleksis Kivi Brothers Seven Translation Assessment Project, publicly accessible, provided by Hong Kong Baptist University Library
 1890 Finnish text, at Project Runeberg.
http://www.seitsemanveljesta.net/

19th-century Finnish novels
1870 novels
Aleksis Kivi
Novels set in Finland
1870 debut novels